Saša Vukas (born September 27, 1976) is a former Croatian professional basketball player.

References

Living people
1976 births
Croatian men's basketball players
Power forwards (basketball)
Basketball players from Rijeka